David Murphy-Kasim Greenwood (born May 27, 1957) is an American retired professional basketball player whose National Basketball Association (NBA) career spanned 12 years from 1979 to 1991. Greenwood made his NBA debut on October 13, 1979 and was named to the NBA All-Rookie First Team during the 1979–80 season. A forward/center, he played for the Chicago Bulls, San Antonio Spurs, Denver Nuggets and Detroit Pistons.

Greenwood was the second overall pick of the 1979 NBA draft. The Chicago Bulls lost the coin toss to the Los Angeles Lakers, who drafted future Hall of Famer Earvin "Magic" Johnson with their number one pick, acquired in a trade with the New Orleans Jazz.

Before the Michael Jordan era in Chicago, Greenwood was one of the franchise's marquee players along with Reggie Theus and Orlando Woolridge. On October 24, 1985, Greenwood was traded by the Bulls to the San Antonio Spurs in exchange for future Hall of Famer George Gervin.

On January 26, 1989, Greenwood and Spurs teammate, Darwin Cook were traded to the Denver Nuggets for Calvin Natt and Jay Vincent. On October 6, 1989, Greenwood signed as an unrestricted free agent with the Detroit Pistons, whom he would assist in a victorious effort in the 1990 NBA Finals as a reserve. He would later sign as an unrestricted free agent with the San Antonio Spurs on August 17, 1990, until his release on May 21, 1991.

Greenwood attended the University of California at Los Angeles. He was inducted into the National Collegiate Basketball Hall of Fame as a member of the Class of 2021

References

External links
NBA.com : David Greenwood Info Page
David Greenwood profile, databaseBasketball.com
UCLA Athletic Site Article

1957 births
Living people
African-American basketball players
All-American college men's basketball players
American men's basketball players
Basketball players from California
Centers (basketball)
Chicago Bulls draft picks
Chicago Bulls players
Denver Nuggets players
Detroit Pistons players
Parade High School All-Americans (boys' basketball)
People from Lynwood, California
Power forwards (basketball)
San Antonio Spurs players
Sportspeople from Los Angeles County, California
UCLA Bruins men's basketball players
Verbum Dei High School alumni
21st-century African-American people
20th-century African-American sportspeople